Mohammed "Mo" Allach (born 20 September 1973) is a Dutch football executive and former player. He serves as the technical director of RKC Waalwijk.

Playing career
Allach studied social pedagogy after high school. He started his professional career at a relatively late age. He was a youth worker in Gouda, South Holland and played at amateur level with DWO in Zoetermeer and Alphense Boys when he was recruited in 1996 by the second-tier Eerste Divisie club Excelsior. Halfway through the 1999–2000 season, Allach moved to top-tier side Feyenoord, where he did not make an official appearance. In 2000, he left for Groningen, where he was a regular starter for more than two seasons. In 2002, he was forced to leave there after a conflict with head coach Dwight Lodeweges, who called him a "source of friction" in the squad.

Allach then played for Dordrecht in the Eerste Divisie and Twente in the Eredivisie. When he was unable to enforce a regular starting spot at the last club, he left for VVV-Venlo in 2004. In 2006, he retired from professional football and then started working as technical director and head of practice at VVV.

Executive career

Twente and RKC
In 2008, Allach moved from the role as technical director and head youth academy of VVV to FC Twente, where he became director of football. After one season at Twente he became director of football affairs at RKC Waalwijk.

KNVB
In 2011, Allach moved into a position as technical manager for the Royal Dutch Football Association (KNVB). Under Allach's period as technical manager, the Netherlands national football team, led by Bert van Marwijk, easily qualified for the UEFA Euro 2012, where the team subsequently went winless in the group stage and were therefore immediately eliminated. On 6 June 2012, the Netherlands were in fourth place in the FIFA World Rankings, only behind Germany, Uruguay and Spain.

Vitesse
In July 2013, Vitesse announced that they had contracted Allach as technical director. He succeeded Ted van Leeuwen. Allach held that position until 2017. During this period, Vitesse won the KNVB Cup, the first silverware in club history. After a short stint with Israeli club Maccabi Haifa, Allach returned to Vitesse in March 2019. Allach left the club nine months later after a conflict with club management.

Return to RKC
On 10 June 2020, RKC Waalwijk announced that Allach would become the new technical director; his second period with the club.

Political career
In late 2003, Allach and friends founded the Maroquistars Foundation, a volunteer organisation that aims at strengthening young people in terms of social resilience through social projects. 

Allach is a member of the Labour Party (PvdA). For the 2006 Dutch general election, he was asked by leader of the party Wouter Bos to run under the PvdA candidate list, but he declined this. For the 2012 Dutch general election, Allach was the PvdA's Lijstduwer. He was in 73rd place, just ahead of Maarten van Rossem.

References

1973 births
Living people
Dutch footballers
Association football defenders
Eredivisie players
Eerste Divisie players
Alphense Boys players
Excelsior Rotterdam players
Feyenoord players
FC Groningen players
FC Dordrecht players
FC Twente players
VVV-Venlo players
FC Twente non-playing staff
RKC Waalwijk non-playing staff
SBV Vitesse non-playing staff
Dutch sportspeople of Moroccan descent
Dutch football chairmen and investors
Footballers from The Hague
Dutch expatriate sportspeople in Israel
Labour Party (Netherlands) politicians
21st-century Dutch politicians